Sibeoci Fiyanggū (? died 1522), also called Shi Baoqi (石报奇), was Chieftain of the Jianzhou Jurchens. He held the position of Jianzhou Left Guard (建州左衛) from 1481 to 1522. After the Qing dynasty was established, he was officially honored with the posthumous name Emperor Zheng (正皇帝).

Descendants 
Sibeoci Fiyanggū was the great-great grandfather of Nurhaci, the man who reorganized and united various Jurchen tribes. Nurhaci's descendants became the last Emperors of China during the Qing Dynasty.

Relations 
 Father: Cungšan (充善)
 Uncle: Agu (阿古)
 Uncle: Qin Yang (秦羊)
 Uncle: Cuyan (褚宴)
 Son: Fuman

References

Jurchens in Ming dynasty
1522 deaths
Year of birth unknown